Non finito is a sculpting technique meaning that the work is unfinished. Italian in etymology, it literally means "not finished". Non finito sculptures appear unfinished because the artist only sculpts part of the block, the figure sometimes appearing to be stuck within the block of material. It was pioneered by Donatello during the Renaissance and was also used by Michelangelo among others.

The philosophic origins of non finito practice come from antiquity and the theories of Plato. Platonic philosophy states that any work of art, or otherwise, never completely resembles its heavenly counterpart. The act of leaving a work unfinished is sometimes a neo-Platonic homage to this. In the case of the ancient Romans, artists would sign their work with the verb faciebat (third-person singular imperfect active indicative of faciō). This verb, following their name, would identify them as the artist, but the work as unfinished (non finito). Some artists, however, signed their work this way even if the work had been refined to the highest degree, as when Michelangelo famously signed his sculpture Pietá, the only sculpture he ever signed.

References

Sculpture techniques